Vancouver-Mount Pleasant is a provincial electoral district for the Legislative Assembly of British Columbia, Canada. It was one of only two electoral districts to return an NDP MLA in the 2001 election when the NDP was nearly wiped off the electoral map, and it did so by a much wider margin than Vancouver-Hastings, the other seat to return a New Democrat.

The NDP routinely wins by over 40 points in this riding. Even during the 2001 landslide victory for the BC Liberals, the NDP won this riding by over 10 points, despite a massive province-wide turn away from the party. Vancouver-Mount Pleasant is therefore considered one of the safest NDP seats in all of British Columbia.

This riding consists of its namesake neighbourhood Mount Pleasant, Vancouver and the eastern parts of downtown Vancouver including Chinatown and Downtown Eastside while the western parts of downtown make up the neighbouring riding of Vancouver-False Creek.

Member of Legislative Assembly 

Its MLA is Melanie Mark, the first First Nation woman elected to the Legislative Assembly of British Columbia, who was elected in a 2016 by-election to replace Jenny Kwan. Kwan had resigned the previous year in order to run in the 2015 Canadian federal election.

Election results

References

External links 
BC Stats
Results of 2001 election (pdf)
2001 Expenditures (pdf)
Results of 1996 election
1996 Expenditures
Results of 1991 election
1991 Expenditures
Website of the Legislative Assembly of British Columbia

Politics of Vancouver
British Columbia provincial electoral districts
Provincial electoral districts in Greater Vancouver and the Fraser Valley